Joel Cook (March 20, 1842December 15, 1910) was an American politician from Pennsylvania who served as a Republican member of the United States House of Representatives for Pennsylvania's 2nd congressional district from 1907 to 1910.

Biography
Joel Cook was born in Philadelphia, Pennsylvania.  He graduated from Central High School in 1859.  He  studied law with William B. Reed and at the University of Pennsylvania.  He was admitted to the bar in 1863.

He practiced law for a few years but left the profession to become a journalist.  During the American Civil War, Cook was a correspondent in Washington D.C. and with the Army of the Potomac for the Philadelphia Press.  He was on the editorial staff of the Philadelphia Public Ledger from 1865 to 1882, and the financial editor from 1883 to 1907.  He also worked as the chief American correspondent for the London Times.

He was president of the board of wardens for the port of Philadelphia 1891-1907.  He also served as president of the board of trade and of the Vessel Owners and Captains’ Association and as member of the Union League of Philadelphia.

He was elected to Congress as a Republican to fill the vacancy caused by the resignation of John E. Reyburn.  He was reelected to the 61st United States Congress and served from 1907 until his death in Philadelphia.  He was interred at Laurel Hill Cemetery in Philadelphia.

Legacy
The Cook-Wissahickon School in Philadelphia is named in his honor.

Bibliography
England, Picturesque and Descriptive, Philadelphia, Porter and Coates, 1882
A Holiday Tour in Europe, Philadelphia, David McKay, Publisher, 1889
An Eastern Tour at Home, Philadelphia, David McKay, Publisher, 1889
America, Picturesque and Descriptive - Volume 1, Philadelphia, Henry T. Coates & Co., 1900
The Philadelphia National Bank - A Century's Record 1803-1903, Philadelphia, Wm.F. Fell Company, 1903
Switzerland, Picturesque and Descriptive, Philadlephia, Henry T. Coates & Co., 1904
America and Her Insular Possessions - Volume 2, Philadelphia, The John C. Winston Co., 1906
Eastern Countries, Philadelphia, The John C. Winston Co., 1910

See also
List of United States Congress members who died in office (1900–49)

Citations

Sources
 Retrieved on 2009-04-25
The Political Graveyard

External links
 
 
 Joel Cook, late a representative from Pennsylvania, Memorial addresses delivered in the House of Representatives and Senate frontispiece 1911

1842 births
1910 deaths
19th-century American journalists
19th-century American lawyers
19th-century American male writers
19th-century American politicians
Burials at Laurel Hill Cemetery (Philadelphia)
Central High School (Philadelphia) alumni
Lawyers from Philadelphia
People of Pennsylvania in the American Civil War
Politicians from Philadelphia
Republican Party members of the United States House of Representatives from Pennsylvania
The Times journalists
University of Pennsylvania alumni
University of Pennsylvania Law School alumni
War correspondents of the American Civil War